The Streets are an English music project led by vocalist and multi-instrumentalist Mike Skinner.

The project has released six studio albums: Original Pirate Material (2002), A Grand Don't Come for Free (2004), The Hardest Way to Make an Easy Living (2006), Everything Is Borrowed (2008), Computers and Blues (2011), an internet-only album Cyberspace and Reds (2011) and a string of successful singles in the mid-2000s, including "Has It Come to This?", "Fit but You Know It", "Dry Your Eyes", "When You Wasn't Famous" and "Prangin' Out".

History

2001–2003: Original Pirate Material
Mike Skinner sent a demo tape to a record shop in north London, run by A&R Nick Worthington. The song developed into Skinner's first single, "Has It Come to This?", and was released under the name The Streets. The song peaked at number 18 on the UK Singles Chart in October 2001.

The Streets' debut album, Original Pirate Material, was released in March 2002. The album was successful both with critics and the general public. In the UK, the album was nominated for the Mercury Prize. Original Pirate Material was nominated for British Album of the Year, and The Streets was nominated for British Urban Act, British Breakthrough Act and British Male Solo Artist at the 2003 BRIT Awards. NME named Original Pirate Material as the third best album of 2002. Subsequent singles from Original Pirate Material include "Don't Mug Yourself", "Weak Become Heroes" and "Let's Push Things Forward".

2004–2005: A Grand Don't Come for Free
In May 2004, Skinner released the single "Fit but You Know It", which peaked at number 4 on the UK Singles Chart. The single was later used by EA Sports as part of the soundtrack for its video game FIFA Football 2005. "Fit But You Know It" appeared on The Streets' second album, A Grand Don't Come for Free. The album entered the UK album charts at number two, but later reached number one after six weeks. The album's second single, "Dry Your Eyes", debuted at the top of the chart in the UK. "Blinded by the Lights", the third single from A Grand Don't Come for Free, peaked at number 10 on the UK Singles Chart in 2004.

2006–2007: The Hardest Way to Make an Easy Living
The Streets' third studio album, The Hardest Way to Make an Easy Living, was released on 10 April 2006. In the UK it debuted the album chart at number one.

2008–2009: Everything Is Borrowed
In September 2008, The Streets released their fourth studio album, Everything Is Borrowed. One song from the album was on Skinner's Myspace page for a while before being replaced by a cover of "Your Song". In a posting on his Myspace blog, Skinner noted that the group's upcoming LP would contain "peaceful, positive vibes" in comparison with 2006's "weird guilt-ridden indulgence" that was The Hardest Way To Make An Easy Living.

In a blurb about the album on Skinner's Myspace, he says, "This album started off life as parables but then I realised that it might get a bit cheesy so I got rid of the alien song and the devil song replaced them with more straight up songs. I've pretty much kept my promise that I made to myself not to reference modern life on any of them though which is hard to do and keep things personal at the same time."

2010–2011: Computers and Blues and Cyberspace and Reds

In November 2010, Skinner announced on the official The Streets website, that he would release what he referred to as a mixtape album called Cyberspace and Reds, consisting of various recordings he had made since he had finished work on the final Streets album, Computers and Blues. Cyberspace and Reds was released in January 2011, initially only for download via the Streets iPhone app. A so-called "deluxe" edition was later made available for general download through the Streets website.

The final Streets album, Computers and Blues, was released on 7 February 2011, the first single being "Going Through Hell".

2017–present
On 22 December 2017, The Streets released two new tracks: "Burn Bridges" and "Sometimes I Hate My Friends More Than My Enemies". It was The Streets' first new music released in six years.

In 2018, The Streets released three singles: "If You Ever Need to Talk I'm Here" was released on 31 January, "You Are Not the Voice in Your Head..." was released on 30 March, and "Call Me in the Morning" was released on 22 November.

On 1 April 2020, Skinner announced a new single featuring Australian music project Tame Impala, included on a mixtape titled None of Us Are Getting Out of This Life Alive, released 10 July 2020. The track premiered on Annie Mac's BBC Radio 1 show.

In March 2021, following the UK Government's announced COVID-19 restriction easing timetable, The Streets released the single Who's Got the Bag (21st June). Referencing the earliest possible date when nightclubs could reopen and the names of members of government the single was described by Skinner as a "protest song".

Band members
Current members
 Mike Skinner – vocals, arranging, composing, mixing, keyboards, synthesizers (1994–2011; 2017–present)
 Kevin Mark Trail – vocals, production, composing (1994–2003; 2007–2011; 2018–present)
 Wayne Bennett – bass guitar, composing, guitar (2007–2011; 2018–present)
 Rob Harvey – vocals, guitar (2011; 2018–present)
 Cassell the Beatmaker – drums (2011; 2018–present)

Other contributors and live members

 Johnny "Drum Machine" Jenkins – drums, percussion, orchestration, production (1994–2011)
 Morgan Nicholls – bass guitar, guitar, percussion, programing piano, synthesizers (2003–2005; 2008)
 Mike Millrain – synths, soundboard, guitar, bass guitar, production
 Chris Brown – synths, piano, keyboards
 Eddie Jenkins – keyboards, piano
 Stuart Coleman – bass guitar
 Steve Corley – keyboards
 Laura Vane – vocals
 Leo the Lion – vocals (2003–2007)

Discography

 Original Pirate Material (2002)
 A Grand Don't Come for Free (2004)
 The Hardest Way to Make an Easy Living (2006)
 Everything Is Borrowed (2008)
 Computers and Blues (2011)
 None of Us Are Getting Out of This Life Alive (2020)

References

External links

 

679 Artists artists
XL Recordings artists
English electronic music groups
Musical groups from Birmingham, West Midlands
Brit Award winners
Ivor Novello Award winners
UK garage groups
Alternative hip hop groups
English hip hop groups
Electronica music groups
Hip house music groups
Grime music groups
Musical groups established in 1994
Musical groups disestablished in 2011
Musical groups reestablished in 2017
Atlantic Records artists
Locked On Records artists
BT Digital Music Awards winners